Seymour Myron "Sy" Hersh (born April 8, 1937) is an American investigative journalist and political writer. He gained recognition in 1969 for exposing the My Lai massacre and its cover-up during the Vietnam War, for which he received the 1970 Pulitzer Prize for International Reporting. During the 1970s, Hersh covered the Watergate scandal for The New York Times, also reporting on the secret U.S. bombing of Cambodia and the CIA's program of domestic spying. In 2004, he detailed the U.S. military's torture and abuse of prisoners at Abu Ghraib in Iraq for The New Yorker. Hersh has won a record five George Polk Awards, and two National Magazine Awards. He is the author of 11 books, including The Price of Power: Kissinger in the Nixon White House (1983), an account of the career of Henry Kissinger which won the National Book Critics Circle Award. 

In 2013, Hersh's reporting alleged that Syrian rebel forces, rather than the government, had attacked civilians with sarin gas at Ghouta during the Syrian Civil War, and in 2015, he presented an alternative account of the U.S. special forces raid in Pakistan which had killed Osama bin Laden, both times attracting controversy and criticism. In 2023, Hersh reported that the U.S. and Norway had bombed the Nord Stream pipelines between Russia and Germany, again stirring controversy. He has been criticized for his use of anonymous sources.

Early life and education 
Seymour Myron Hersh was born in Chicago on April 8, 1937, to Isador and Dorothy Hersh (née Margolis), Yiddish-speaking Jews who had immigrated to the U.S. in the 1920s from Lithuania and Poland, respectively. Isador's original surname was Hershowitz, which he had changed upon becoming a citizen in 1930. As a teenager, Seymour helped run the family's dry cleaning shop on the South Side. Hersh graduated from Hyde Park High School in 1954, then attended the University of Illinois Chicago and later the University of Chicago, where he graduated with a history degree in 1958. He worked as a Xerox salesman before being admitted to the University of Chicago Law School in 1959, but was expelled during his first year due to poor grades.

Newspaper career 

After briefly working at a Walgreens drug store, Hersh began his career in 1959 with a seven-month stint at the City News Bureau of Chicago, first as a copyboy and later as a crime reporter. In 1960, he enlisted as an Army reservist, and spent three months in basic training at Fort Leavenworth in Kansas. After returning to Chicago, in 1961 Hersh launched the Evergreen Dispatch, a short-lived weekly newspaper for the suburb of Evergreen Park. He moved to Pierre, South Dakota, in 1962 to work as a correspondent for United Press International (UPI), reporting on the state legislature and writing a series of articles on the Oglala Sioux.

In 1963, Hersh moved back to Chicago to work for the Associated Press (AP), and in 1965 he was transferred to its Washington, D.C., bureau to report on the Pentagon. While in Washington, he befriended famed investigative journalist I. F. Stone, whose muckraking newsletter I. F. Stone's Weekly served as an inspiration. Hersh began to develop his investigative methods, often walking out of regimented press briefings at the Pentagon to interview high-ranking officers in their lunch halls. In 1966, Hersh reported on the intensifying U.S. involvement in the Vietnam War, writing series of articles on draft reform, the shortage of qualified pilots, and on the U.S. bombing of civilian targets in North Vietnam, revealed by New York Times correspondent Harrison Salisbury.

In 1967, Hersh became part of the AP's first special investigative unit. After his editors diminished a piece he wrote on the U.S.'s secretive chemical and biological weapons programs, he quit and became a freelancer. Hersh wrote six articles in national magazines in 1967 (two for The New Republic, two for Ramparts, and two for The New York Times Magazine) in which he detailed the government's growing stockpiles of the weapons and its co-operation with universities and corporations, as well as the secret adoption of a first-use policy. The research formed the basis for his first book, Chemical and Biological Warfare: America's Hidden Arsenal (1968), and the topic was highlighted that year by the Dugway sheep incident, in which an aerial test of VX nerve agent at the U.S. Army's Dugway Proving Ground in Utah inadvertently killed more than 6,000 sheep owned by local ranchers. The event and Hersh's reporting led to public hearings and international pressure, contributing to the Nixon administration's decision to end the U.S. biological weapons program in 1969.

In the first three months of 1968, Hersh served as the press secretary for anti–Vietnam War candidate Senator Eugene McCarthy in his campaign in the 1968 Democratic Party presidential primaries. After resigning before the Wisconsin primary, he returned to journalism as a freelance reporter on Vietnam.

My Lai massacre 

In 1969, Hersh's freelance reporting exposed the My Lai massacre, the murder of between 347 and 504 unarmed Vietnamese civilians (almost all women, children, and elderly men) by U.S. soldiers in a village on March 16, 1968. 

On October 22, 1969, Hersh received a tip from Geoffrey Cowan, a columnist for The Village Voice with a military source, about a soldier being held at Fort Benning in Georgia for a court-martial for allegedly killing 75 civilians in South Vietnam. After speaking with a Pentagon contact and Fort Benning's public relations office, Hersh found an AP story from September 7 that identified the soldier as Lieutenant William Calley. He next found Calley's lawyer, George W. Latimer, who met with him in Salt Lake City, Utah, and showed him a document which revealed Calley was charged with killing 109 people. Hersh traveled to Fort Benning on November 11, where he quickly gained the confidence of Calley's roommates and eventually Calley himself, whom he interviewed that night. Hersh's first article on the massacre, a cautious and conservative piece which was approved with Latimer, was initially rejected by Life and Look magazines. Hersh next approached the anti-war Dispatch News Service run by his friend David Obst, which sold the story to 35 national papers. On November 13, the story appeared in The Washington Post, The Boston Globe, the Miami Herald, the Chicago Sun-Times, The Seattle Times, and Newsday, among others. Initial reaction was muted, with the press focusing on a massive anti-war demonstration in Washington on November 15. 

Follow-up articles by other reporters revealed that the Army's investigation had been prompted by a letter on March 29 from Ronald Ridenhour, a Vietnam veteran who had interviewed soldiers who knew of the killings. After traveling to California and visiting Ridenhour, who gave him their personal information, Hersh traveled across the country to interview the soldiers. This revealed that eyewitnesses had been told not to talk to anyone, and that the actual death count was in the hundreds. On November 20, Dispatch syndicated Hersh's second article, which was internationally published. On the same day, photos of the massacre by Army photographer Ronald L. Haeberle were published in the Cleveland Plain Dealer, causing outrage among members of Congress and the public. The reporting was now being followed by The New York Times and the Post, and was covered on the CBS and NBC national nightly news. 

Hersh next interviewed Paul Meadlo, a soldier who admitted that he had killed dozens of civilians on the orders of Calley. Meadlo's mother told Hersh that she "sent them a good boy and they made him a murderer". Hersh's third article was syndicated by Dispatch on November 25, and that night an interview with Meadlo by Mike Wallace on the CBS News program 60 Minutes was broadcast on national television. The White House acknowledged the massacre for the first time the next day, and the Army appointed General William R. Peers to head an official commission investigating it. Hersh proceeded to visit 50 witnesses over the next three months, 35 of whom agreed to talk. His fourth article, syndicated on December 2, revealed random killings of civilians in the days before the massacre; a fifth article was published weeks later. Ten pages of Haeberle's photos were printed in Life magazine on December 5. 

Hersh's reporting garnered him national fame, and encouraged the growing opposition to the war in the U.S. However, he was also attacked by some in the press and government, who questioned his work and motivations. An op-ed column in the Times by James Reston asked: "Whatever happened in the massacre, should it be reported by press, radio and television, since clearly reporting the murder of civilians by American soldiers helps the enemy, divides the people of this country, and damages the ideal of America in the world?" South Carolina Republican Representative Albert Watson said, "this is no time to cast aspersions on our fighting men, the President and ourselves for that matter, as some members of the national news media and a few demagogues are doing". The reveal of the massacre changed American media coverage of the war, which was restrained and had limited independence from official sources in its reporting before 1967; after the exposure of the My Lai massacre, major newspapers began reporting on other U.S. atrocities in Vietnam.

For his coverage, Hersh won the 1970 Pulitzer Prize for International Reporting and numerous other awards, including his first George Polk Award. He later wrote in a note to Robert Loomis, the editor of his 1970 book-length account of the massacre, My Lai 4: A Report on the Massacre and Its Aftermath:

On March 14, 1970, the Peers Commission submitted to the Army its secret report on the massacre, containing more than 20,000 pages of testimony from 400 witnesses. One of Hersh's sources leaked the testimony to him over the course of a year; it revealed that at least 347 civilians were killed, over twice as many as the Army had publicly conceded. The leak formed the basis for two articles by Hersh for The New Yorker magazine in 1972, which alleged that officers had destroyed documents on the massacre, as well as his 1972 book Cover-Up: The Army's Secret Investigation of the Massacre at My Lai 4.

The New York Times 

In April 1972, Hersh was hired by The New York Times as an investigative journalist at the paper's Washington bureau. After the June 17 break-in at the Democratic National Committee headquarters in Washington and the emergence of the Watergate scandal, the Times sought to catch up with the reporting of Bob Woodward and Carl Bernstein at The Washington Post, who broke several stories in 1972 linking the break-in to the Nixon campaign. Together with Walter Rugaber, Hersh produced extensive reporting for the Times on the unfolding scandal; a key article by him published on January 14, 1973, revealed that hush money payments were still being made to the burglars, which shifted the press's focus from the break-in itself to its cover-up. During 1973, Hersh wrote more than 40 articles on Watergate, most printed on page one; his reveals included the FBI's failure to investigate political operative Donald Segretti, despite knowing of his activities, and leaks from the grand jury testimonies of former Attorney General John Mitchell and burglar James McCord, the latter of which revealed that the Committee to Re-Elect the President had made the payments. John Dean, Nixon's counsel, later said that while it had been the Post articles in 1972 that had encouraged prosecutors, "the most devastating pieces that strike awfully close to home" were Hersh's in 1973 and 1974. 

Hersh contributed to the revelations around Operation Menu, the secret U.S. bombing of neutral Cambodia in 1969–1970. On June 11, 1972, an article by Hersh alleged that General John D. Lavelle, who had recently been relieved as commander of the Air Force in Southeast Asia, was ousted because he had ordered repeated, unauthorized bombings of North Vietnam. The ensuing "Lavelle affair" led to Senate Armed Services Committee hearings in September 1972. After reading Hersh's articles on the affair, Major Hal Knight, who had supervised radar crews in Vietnam, realized that the Senate "was unaware of what had taken place while I was out there", and in early 1973 wrote a letter to the committee that confessed his role in the cover-up of Operation Menu, in which he recorded fake bombing coordinates and burned his orders. Hersh learned of Knight's letter after exposing a different scandal on May 17, 1973, in which Nixon and National Security Advisor Henry Kissinger had authorized wiretaps of employees of the National Security Council after early bombings of Cambodia were exposed in the Times in May 1969. Hersh interviewed Knight and detailed the cover-up of Menu in an article on July 15, 1973, one day before the start of Knight's public testimony. On July 16, Secretary of Defense James R. Schlesinger admitted that the Air Force had flown 3,630 raids over Cambodia in 14 months, dropping more than 100,000 tons of bombs. Hersh continued to investigate who had ordered the cover-up; in a rare telephone interview, Kissinger stated Nixon had "neither ordered nor was aware of any falsification". On July 31, former chairman of the Joint Chiefs of Staff General Earle Wheeler admitted that Nixon had ordered him to falsify records. Nixon's impeachment on this basis was proposed that day by Representative Robert Drinan, and it was considered as an article alongside the Watergate cover-up during the House debate on Nixon's articles of impeachment in July 1974.

In early 1974, Hersh planned to publish a story on "Project Jennifer" (later revealed to be codenamed Project Azorian), a covert CIA operation that partially recovered the sunken Soviet submarine K-129 from the floor of the Pacific Ocean with a purpose-built vessel, the Glomar Explorer. The ship, which was falsely presented as a underwater mineral mining vessel, was built by a company owned by magnate Howard Hughes. After a discussion with CIA director William Colby, Hersh promised not to publish the story while the operation was still active, in order to avoid triggering a potential international incident. The Times eventually published Hersh's article on March 19, 1975, with an added five-paragraph explanation of the publishing history and one-year delay.

On September 8, 1974, an article by Hersh revealed that the CIA, with the approval of Kissinger, had spent $8 million to influence unions, political parties, and media in Chile in order to destabilize the government of socialist Salvador Allende, who was overthrown in the September 11, 1973, coup d'état that brought to power a military dictatorship under General Augusto Pinochet. Hersh followed up the story over the next two months, with 27 articles in total.

On December 22, 1974, Hersh exposed Operation CHAOS, a massive CIA program of domestic wiretapping and infiltration of anti-war groups during the Nixon administration, which was conducted in direct violation of the agency's charter. Hersh reported that dossiers had been compiled on at least 10,000 American citizens, including congressmen; the government eventually conceded the figure was closer to 300,000. He wrote 34 more articles on the story over the next months; they prompted the formation of the Rockefeller Commission and Church Committee, which investigated covert CIA operations and led to reforms of the agency. Hersh's exposure of CHAOS was the earliest reporting to reveal contents of the CIA's "Family Jewels" list of its own illegal activities. Hersh soon felt "double-crossed" after learning of a January 16, 1975, meeting between the paper's top editors (including executive editor A. M. Rosenthal) and President Gerald Ford, in which the president mentioned CIA political assassinations—a comment which he subsequently asked to be struck from the record; the editors later agreed not to tell Hersh about the disclosure. Hersh thereafter decided to move away from reporting on the CIA. 

On May 25, 1975, Hersh revealed that the U.S. Navy was using submarines to collect intelligence inside the three-mile protected coastal zone of the Soviet Union in a spy program codenamed "Holystone", which had continued for at least 15 years. It was later revealed that Dick Cheney, one of Ford's top aides and later George W. Bush's vice president, proposed that the FBI search the home of Hersh and his sources in order to halt his reporting on the subject.

In 1976, Hersh moved with his family to New York, where his wife was to attend medical school. He began working on larger projects; the first was a four-part investigation produced with Jeff Gerth, initially appearing on June 27, 1976, into the activities of Sidney Korshak, a lawyer and "fixer" for the Chicago Mafia, union leaders, and Hollywood. On July 24, 1977, the Times published the first entry in a three-part investigation by Hersh and Gerth into financial impropriety at Gulf and Western Industries, one of the country's largest conglomerates; it was followed by two civil lawsuits by the Securities and Exchange Commission. The Times management was ambivalent about Hersh's new focus (he later stated that the paper "wasn't nearly as happy when we went after business wrongdoing as when we were kicking around some slob in government"), and he left the job in 1979 to start writing a book on Henry Kissinger.

In 1981, an article by Hersh in The New York Times Magazine described how former CIA agents Edwin Wilson and Frank Terpil had worked with Colonel Muammar Gaddafi, the leader of Libya, to illegally export explosives and train his troops for terrorism. Hersh reported that the CIA had given the pair tacit approval to oversee the sale of American technology. The story was followed up by Gerth at the Times through 1982, prompting reforms at the agency.

Investigative books: 1980s and 1990s

Hersh's 1983 book The Price of Power: Kissinger in the Nixon White House, which involved four years of exhaustive work and more than 1,000 interviews, was a best-seller and won him the National Book Critics Circle Award for Nonfiction. The 698-page book contained 41 chapters, including 13 devoted to Kissinger's role in Vietnam and the bombing of Cambodia; other topics included his role in the Chilean coup, the Indo-Pakistani War of 1971, domestic wiretapping, and the White House Plumbers, as well as Hersh's criticism of his former Times colleagues, such as Max Frankel and James Reston, for their proximity to him. One much-discussed allegation was that Kissinger, originally an advisor to Nelson Rockefeller in the 1968 Republican Party presidential primaries before his defeat to Nixon, had offered Democratic candidate Hubert Humphrey damaging material on Nixon before going to the Nixon campaign with secret information he had gathered from the Vietnam War's Paris peace negotiations. The book also alleges that Kissinger alerted Nixon to President Johnson's October 31, 1968, bombing halt 12 hours in advance, securing his position in the administration. The book is noted for its density of information and prosecutorial tone, and it has been credited with preventing Kissinger from returning to a government position during the Reagan administration.

While writing the book, Hersh revisited his previous reporting on Edward M. Korry, the U.S. ambassador to Chile from 1967 to 1971. In 1974, Hersh had reported in the Times that Korry had known of the CIA's efforts to foment a coup. Korry, who had reacted to the claim with furious denial, demanded a front-page retraction in exchange for documents Hersh wanted for his book. The retraction, which Time called the "longest correction ever published", appeared on February 9, 1981. Peter Kornbluh, Chile expert at the National Security Archive, later judged based on declassified documents that Korry was unaware of CIA involvement. Also in the book was the claim that former Indian Prime Minister Morarji Desai had been paid $20,000 per year by the CIA during the Johnson and Nixon administrations. Desai filed a $50 million libel lawsuit against Hersh; when it went to trial in 1989, Desai, then 93, was too ill to attend, but Kissinger appeared and testified that Desai had not worked in any capacity for the CIA. A Chicago jury ruled in favor of Hersh, finding it had not been proved that Hersh had intended to write falsehoods or that he had shown reckless disregard for the truth, either of which must be proven in a libel suit.

After the Kissinger book, Hersh worked on the 1985 PBS Frontline documentary "Buying the Bomb", which reported on a Pakistani businessman who had attempted to smuggle electrical devices that could be used as nuclear bomb triggers out of the U.S. On June 12, 1986, an article written by Hersh in the Times revealed that U.S.-backed Panamanian dictator Manuel Noriega was a major figure in weapons and narcotics trafficking. The reporting was the first in a "political landslide" of revelations about Noriega; in 1989, the U.S. invaded Panama and captured him, bringing him back to the U.S. to stand trial.

Hersh spent much of the decade writing two critically acclaimed but commercially unsuccessful books. In his 1986 title The Target Is Destroyed, Hersh examined the 1983 shootdown of Korean Air Lines Flight 007 by the Soviet Union. He reported that the U.S. Air Force knew almost immediately that the Soviets believed that they had shot down a military plane, and that the U.S. misrepresented the situation to portray the Soviets as deliberate murderers of civilians. In The Samson Option (1991), Hersh chronicled the history of Israel's nuclear weapon program, arguing that a nuclear capability was sought from the state's founding, and that it was achieved under a U.S. policy of feigned ignorance and indirect assistance. Hersh also wrote that Israel received aid from the U.S. in the 1973 Yom Kippur War through "nuclear blackmail" (Israel's threat to use the weapons against its Arab enemies). Another major allegation was that the intelligence passed to Israel by convicted American spy Jonathan Pollard had been shared with the Soviet Union by former Prime Minister Yitzhak Rabin, who denied the charge. Another allegation was that British media magnate Robert Maxwell was an informant for Mossad, Israel's national intelligence agency; Maxwell filed a defamation lawsuit against Hersh, but died in a drowning incident two weeks after the book was published.

Hersh's 1997 best-seller The Dark Side of Camelot, about the political career of John F. Kennedy, was controversial and heavily criticized. Shortly before publication, it emerged in the press that Hersh had removed claims at the last minute which were based on forged documents provided to him by fraudster Lex Cusack, including a fake hush money contract between Kennedy and Marilyn Monroe. An article about the controversy in The Washington Post said: "The strange and twisted saga of the JFK file is part cautionary tale, part slapstick farce, a story of deception and self-delusion in the service of commerce and journalism". Hersh and a one-time co-author had received a $800,000 advance for the project. Other aspects of the book also came under criticism, including its prying into Kennedy's alleged sexual escapades based on interviews with his Secret Service guards, and its claim that Kennedy used Judith Exner as a courier to deliver cash to mobster Sam Giancana, made by a source who later recanted it before the Assassination Records Review Board.

In 1998, Hersh published Against All Enemies: Gulf War Syndrome: The War Between America's Ailing Veterans and Their Government, about Gulf War syndrome. He estimated that 15 percent of returning American troops were afflicted with the chronic and multi-symptomatic disorder, and challenged the government claim that they were suffering from war fatigue, as opposed to the effects of a chemical or biological weapon. He suggested the smoke from the destruction of a weapon depot that stored nerve gas at Khamisiyah in Iraq, which more than 100,000 soldiers were exposed to, as a possible cause.

Later investigations 
Starting in 1993, Hersh became a regular contributor to The New Yorker magazine, edited by Tina Brown until 1998 and David Remnick thereafter. A piece by him in 1993 alleged that Pakistan had developed nuclear weapons with the consent of the Reagan and Bush administrations, using restricted, high-tech materials purchased in the U.S. In May 2000, a 25,000-word article by Hersh titled "Overwhelming Force", the longest piece in the magazine since 1993,  detailed the Battle of Rumaila, an alleged massacre of retreating and surrendering Iraqi troops by soldiers under General Barry McCaffrey on the "Highway of Death" in the final days of the 1990–1991 Gulf War. He had received tips on the incident, which had been investigated and dismissed by the U.S. Army, from other officers while investigating McCaffrey's role in the Colombian drug war. Hersh performed six months of research for the article, and interviewed 300 people, including soldiers who had witnessed the killings; he alleged that McCaffrey had deceived his superiors and disregarded cease-fire orders. In July 2001, the magazine published Hersh's investigation of Mobil's illegal multibillion-dollar oil swap deal between Kazakhstan and Iran in the 1990s.

Following the September 11, 2001, terrorist attacks, Hersh turned his focus to U.S. policy in the Middle East and the Bush administration's "war on terror". In The New Yorker, he reported on U.S. intelligence failures surrounding 9/11; on the corruption of the Saudi royal family and its alleged financial support for Osama bin Laden; and on the potential instability of the Pakistani nuclear arsenal, including an article alleging that the Pentagon was planning a covert operation inside Pakistan to disarm the weapons. President Bush told Pakistani President Pervez Musharraf that Hersh was "a liar". During the U.S. invasion of Afghanistan, Hersh reported that a Predator drone had followed a convoy carrying Taliban leader Mullah Omar, but that delayed approval for a missile strike had allowed him to escape; that a failed Army Delta Force raid on Omar's compound in Kandahar had led to an escape in which 12 soldiers were injured; and that a U.S.-backed airlift of Pakistani officers from Kunduz in Afghanistan had inadvertently carried Taliban and al-Qaeda fighters. Hersh later reported on the government's flawed prosecution of Zacarias Moussaoui, on the U.S.'s aggressive assassination efforts against al-Qaeda members, and on business conflicts of interest held by Richard Perle, chairman of the Pentagon's advisory Defense Policy Board, which led to his resignation.

Iraq and Abu Ghraib

Following the U.S. invasion of Iraq in 2003, Hersh disputed the Bush administration's false claims about Saddam Hussein's alleged stockpile of weapons of mass destruction and ties to terrorism, which had been used to justify the invasion. He reported that the claim that Iraq had received nuclear materials from Niger was based on forged documents, that the Pentagon's Office of Special Plans had provided dubious intelligence to the White House on Iraq's weapons capacity, and that the Bush administration had pressured the intelligence community to violate its "stovepiping" rule, which allowed only vetted and confirmed information to rise up the chain of command. 

On April 30, 2004, Hersh published the first of three articles in The New Yorker which detailed the U.S. military's torture and abuse of detainees at Abu Ghraib prison near Baghdad. The story, titled "Torture at Abu Ghraib", was accompanied by a now-infamous photo of an Iraqi prisoner standing on a box and wearing a black pointed hood, his hands spread out and attached to electrodes. A short piece with the photo and others had appeared two days earlier on the CBS News program 60 Minutes II, in anticipation of Hersh's article. He described these photos:

Hersh had obtained a secret 53-page report from an internal Army investigation headed by General Antonio Taguba, which had been submitted on March 3. It detailed more of the abuses, including pouring cold water and liquid from broken chemical lights on naked detainees, beatings with a broom stick and a chair, threatening males with rape, allowing guards to stitch wounds from a beating, sodomizing a detainee with a chemical light and a broom stick, and using military dogs to intimidate. The article also alleged that military intelligence teams, which included CIA officers and "interrogation specialists" from private contractors, had directed the abuse at the prison. In two articles in May 2004, "Chain of Command" and "The Gray Zone", Hersh alleged that the abuse stemmed from a top-secret special access program (SAP) authorized by Secretary of Defense Donald Rumsfeld during the invasion of Afghanistan in 2001, which provided blanket approval for killings, kidnappings, and interrogations (at Guantanamo Bay and CIA black sites) of "high-value" targets. He alleged that the SAP was extended to Iraq's military prisons in 2003 to gather intelligence on the growing insurgency, with Rumsfeld and Under Secretary of Defense for Intelligence Stephen Cambone also extending its methods of physical coercion and sexual humiliation, under the name "Copper Green".

In a rare statement responding directly to the allegations, Pentagon spokesman Lawrence Di Rita said that they were "outlandish, conspiratorial, and filled with error and anonymous conjecture", and that they reflected "the fevered insights of those with little, if any, connection to the activities in the Department of Defense"; he added that: "With these false claims, the Magazine and the reporter have made themselves part of the story." As the scandal grew and calls for Rumsfeld to resign mounted, he privately offered to step down, which Bush rejected. Later stories by other reporters revealed the Torture Memos, in which the Department of Justice had advised the Pentagon and the CIA on the legality of "enhanced interrogation techniques". As after Hersh's reporting on the My Lai massacre, he garnered national and international attention and won multiple awards, including his fifth George Polk Award. A book compiling and building upon his post-9/11 reporting for The New Yorker, titled Chain of Command: The Road from 9/11 to Abu Ghraib, was published later in 2004.

In July 2005, an article by Hersh alleged that the U.S. had covertly intervened in favor of Ayad Allawi in the January 2005 Iraqi parliamentary election, in an "off the books" campaign conducted by retired CIA officers and non-government personnel, and with funds "not necessarily" appropriated by Congress.

Iran 
In a January 2005 article for The New Yorker titled "The Coming Wars", Hersh wrote that the next U.S. target in the Middle East was Iran, and alleged that covert U.S. reconnaissance missions, including a commando task force, had infiltrated the country to gather intelligence on nuclear, chemical, and missile sites since mid-2004. In April 2006, an article by Hersh titled "The Iran Plans" alleged that the Bush administration was accelerating military planning for an attack on Iran, and that the Pentagon had presented the White House the option of using bunker-buster nuclear weapons on the country's underground uranium enrichment sites; he further alleged that the Joint Chiefs of Staff later sought to drop this option, which had been resisted by White House officials. The article also alleged that U.S. troops were infiltrating Iran to establish contact with anti-government minority groups, and that carrier-based aircraft were flying simulated nuclear bombing runs. Hersh wrote several more pieces on this alleged plan in the next two years, including a July 2006 article on how senior commanders were challenging Bush's plan for a major bombing campaign, articles in November 2006 and March 2007 on the plan's re-focusing on targets in Iran aiding Iraqi militants, and an October 2007 article on planned "surgical" strikes on Iranian Quds Force training camps and supply depots.

In an August 2006 article, Hersh alleged that the U.S. was involved in the planning of Israel's attacks on Hezbollah in the 2006 Lebanon War as a "prelude" to the U.S. bombing of Iran. In his March 2007 article, titled "The Redirection", he alleged that the U.S. and Saudi Arabia were covertly supporting Sunni extremist groups to combat the influence of Shiite Iran and Syria, and that the Lebanese government of Fouad Siniora was using its U.S. backing to supply weapons to Osbat al-Ansar and Fatah al-Islam, militant groups in Palestinian refugee camps, to develop a counter-balance to Shiite-backed Hezbollah. In May 2007, Lebanon launched an attack on Fatah al-Islam, which it accused of having ties to the Syrian government, starting a severe domestic conflict.

In a June 2008 article titled "Preparing the Battlefield", Hersh alleged that Congress had secretly appropriated $400 million for a major escalation of covert operations against Iran in late 2007, following a request from President Bush. The request allegedly "focused on undermining Iran's nuclear ambitions and trying to undermine the government through regime change", and included new activities such as the funding of opposition groups in the south and east of the country. The article also alleged that Vice President Dick Cheney, after a January 2008 incident in the Strait of Hormuz in which a U.S. warship had nearly fired on Iranian boats, had held a meeting on how to create a casus belli for a war; Hersh later said in an interview that one of the options discussed and rejected was a false flag operation involving Navy SEALs, who would pose as Iranian patrols and start a firefight with U.S. ships. Hersh later began writing a book on Cheney in 2011, which he spent four years on before dropping amid a crackdown on leaks, instead writing his 2018 memoir Reporter.

Hersh alleged in a May 2011 article titled "Iran And the Bomb" that the U.S. lacked conclusive evidence that Iran was developing nuclear weapons, citing a  still-classified National Intelligence Estimate produced by the National Intelligence Council earlier that year. The summary of the 2007 estimate, which had been released publicly, had found "with high confidence" that Iran had halted its weapons program in late 2003 after the invasion of Iraq; Hersh alleged that the 2011 estimate found that this program had been aimed at Iraq (which Iran had believed to be developing a nuclear weapon), not Israel or the U.S., and that no new evidence had changed the 2007 assessment, despite expanded covert surveillance. In a November 2011 article after the release of a report by the International Atomic Energy Agency (IAEA) on possible military dimensions of Iran's nuclear program, Hersh disputed that the findings were new or transformative, arguing that there remained "no definitive evidence" of a weapons program, and calling the report a "political document" in an interview.

Syria and chemical attacks 
In February 2008, an article by Hersh questioned the Israeli and American claims that a Syrian facility bombed by Israel in September 2007 was an under-construction nuclear reactor; a later report by the IAEA in 2011 found it was "very likely" that it was a secret reactor. An article by Hersh in April 2009, citing his correspondence with Syrian President Bashar al-Assad, suggested that Syria was eager for a peace deal with Israel over the Golan Heights, as well as negotiations with the West over Iraq, and Syria's support for Hamas and Hezbollah. Hersh concluded that the Obama administration had a chance for diplomacy with Syria and perhaps Iran, which he wrote could become an ally in Afghanistan. Later that year, Hersh interviewed Assad in Damascus.  

On December 8, 2013, an article by Hersh titled "Whose sarin?", published in the London Review of Books (LRB), alleged that the Obama administration had "cherry-picked intelligence" on the August 21, 2013, sarin attack at Ghouta during the Syrian Civil War, which had killed hundreds of civilians, in order to attribute the attack to Assad's government and justify a military strike. The article, which had been rejected by The New Yorker and The Washington Post, alleged that a cable sent to the Defense Intelligence Agency in June and other intelligence reports had found that al-Nusra, a branch of al-Qaeda and part of the Syrian opposition, was also capable of producing and deploying sarin. Hersh also alleged that a U.S. sensor system's detection of sarin production at a government depot in December 2012 had prompted Obama's public warning that the use of sarin was "totally unacceptable", which was not repeated before the Ghouta attack.

In a second article published in the LRB in April 2014, titled "The Red Line and the Rat Line", Hersh alleged that the attack was conducted by al-Nusra with the aid of the Turkish government of Recep Tayyip Erdoğan in a false flag operation aimed at drawing the U.S. into the war against Assad. It described an alleged supply chain operation, organized by the CIA and the United Kingdom's MI6 with funding from Saudi Arabia and Qatar, which transported weapons to the Syrian rebels from Libya via southern Turkey between early 2012 and the September 2012 attack on the U.S. consulate and CIA annex at Benghazi. Hersh alleged that Turkey's National Intelligence Organization and Gendarmerie had proceeded to instruct al-Nusra on producing and deploying sarin, and that the planned U.S. strike was averted after British intelligence found that samples of sarin from Ghouta did not match batches from Syria's arsenal.

A report from an investigation by the United Nations (UN) concluded that sarin had been used at Ghouta, but did not assign responsibility for the attack. Blogger Eliot Higgins and chemical weapons expert Dan Kaszeta disputed some of the claims in the articles with open-source intelligence, writing that the "improvised" rockets had been used by the Syrian Army as early as November 2012, and that the front lines on the day of the attack were just  from the impact sites, within Postol's estimated range. They also criticized the claim of al-Nusra responsibility, citing the high difficulty and expense of producing sarin, and the presence of hexamine in the Ghouta samples, an additive which Syria later declared part of its chemical weapons program.

In a December 2015 article in the LRB titled "Military to Military", Hersh alleged that the Joint Chiefs of Staff, after discovering by mid-2013 that Turkey was aiding al-Nusra and the Islamic State (ISIS) and that the moderate rebels were no longer viable, had sabotaged Obama's support for the rebels by sending U.S. intelligence to the militaries of Germany, Russia, and Israel, on the understanding it would be forwarded to Assad. In exchange for this support, aimed at defeating ISIS, Hersh alleged that the Joint Chiefs had required that Assad "restrain" Hezbollah from attacking Israel, restart negotiations with Israel over the Golan Heights, agree to accept Russian advisers, and hold elections after the war. This alleged alliance ended in September 2015 upon the retirement of its architect, chairman General Martin Dempsey. Max Fisher of Vox criticized the narrative, citing reporting that Syria and Russia were primarily bombing anti-ISIS rebels instead of ISIS, and Dempsey's prominent public support for sending more arms to the rebels, over which he had clashed with Obama.  

On June 25, 2017, the German newspaper Die Welt published Hersh's article "Trump's Red Line", which had been rejected by the LRB. It alleged that  the Syrian Air Force's April 4, 2017, attack at Khan Shaykhun was not a sarin attack, but a conventional bombing conducted with Russian intelligence that struck a regional headquarters building with "fertilisers, disinfectants and other goods" in its basement, which created "effects similar to those of sarin". The article further alleged that the April 7 missile strike on Shayrat Airbase, ordered by President Trump, was conducted despite U.S. intelligence affirming a conventional bombing. Higgins again criticized Hersh's claims, writing for Bellingcat that they were inconsistent with Syrian and Russian descriptions of the target and satellite images of the impact sites, as well as findings of sarin and hexamine in samples retrieved by the Organisation for the Prohibition of Chemical Weapons (OPCW). A later investigation by a joint UN–OPCW panel found that the attack was a sarin bombing by the Syrian Air Force.

Killing of Osama bin Laden 

In a September 2013 interview, Hersh commented that the U.S.'s account of the May 2, 2011, raid in Abbottabad, Pakistan, which killed Osama bin Laden was "one big lie, not one word of it is true". He stated that both the Obama administration and Pakistan had lied about the event, and that American media outlets were reluctant to challenge the administration, saying: "It's pathetic, they are more than obsequious, they are afraid to pick on this guy [Obama]". Hersh later said that his sources told him that the official story was false days after the raid, but that The New Yorker had rejected his article pitches.

On May 10, 2015, a 10,000-word article by Hersh detailing an alternative account of the raid, titled "The Killing of Osama bin Laden", was published in the London Review of Books. The official account was that bin Laden had been located through interrogation of detainees and surveillance of his courier, that Pakistan was unaware of the operation, and that he was killed only when he did not surrender; Hersh reported that bin Laden had been captured and held as a prisoner of Pakistan's Inter-Services Intelligence (ISI) since 2006, that his location was revealed to the CIA by a former Pakistani intelligence officer in 2010, that top Pakistani military officials knew about the operation, and that bin Laden had been assassinated. The article alleged Pakistan had kept bin Laden, with financial support from Saudi Arabia, as leverage against al-Qaeda, and that it agreed to give him up in exchange for increased U.S. military aid and a "freer hand in Afghanistan". Further allegations were that the leak of the identity of Jonathan Bank, the CIA station chief in Islamabad who had fled the country, was part of the cover; that bin Laden's DNA had been collected by a Pakistani Army doctor, not by Shakil Afridi in a fake vaccination drive organized by the CIA; that the Navy SEALs met no resistance at the compound, and were escorted by an ISI officer to bin Laden's room; that his body was "torn apart with rifle fire"; and that pieces of his corpse were "tossed out over the Hindu Kush mountains" on the flight back to Jalalabad, rather than being buried at sea. A book compiling the article and Hersh's pieces on Syria for the magazine, The Killing of Osama bin Laden, was published in 2016.

Hersh's article was heavily criticized by other reporters. The narrative was similar to a little-known August 2011 post by national security blogger R.J. Hillhouse, who called Hersh's article "either plagiarism or unoriginal" (though she speculated they used different sources); Hersh denied having read her work. Max Fisher of Vox accused Hersh's story of "internal contradictions" and "troubling inconsistencies" in a long analysis, questioning the claims that the U.S. and Pakistan had struck a secret deal (as U.S. aid had fallen and relations had deteriorated in the years after the raid), that a secret mock-up of the compound was built to train the SEALs (despite that the real one was allegedly unguarded), and that the intelligence materials purportedly captured were faked (despite that bin Laden's successor Ayman al-Zawahiri said they were genuine). Peter Bergen of CNN, who had visited the compound after the operation, criticized the claim that the only shots fired were those that killed bin Laden, reporting that he had seen evidence of a protracted firefight, as the compound was "littered almost everywhere with broken glass and several areas of it were sprayed with bullet holes". He questioned the claim of Saudi support, citing the fact that a stated goal of bin Laden was the overthrow of the Saudi royal family, for which his Saudi citizenship was revoked in 1994.

Both journalists, as well as Jack Shafer at Politico and James Kirchik for Slate, criticized Hersh's sources, none of whom were directly involved in the operation or its planning, a "retired senior [U.S.] intelligence official", "two longtime consultants to the Special Operations Command", and retired Pakistani General Asad Durrani, who headed the ISI from 1990 to 1992, with Fisher writing that this was "worryingly little evidence for a story that accuses hundreds of people across three governments of staging a massive international hoax that has gone on for years". The article was also criticized for its claim that Pakistan had insisted on an elaborate raid when there were simpler and lower-risk methods, with Fisher asking why bin Laden was not killed and his body handed over to the U.S., or killed in a U.S. drone strike. Hersh's article stated that a drone strike in Afghanistan was the original cover story for the raid before one of the Black Hawk helicopters crashed in the compound and was demolished by the SEALs with explosives, which was impossible to hide.

Some details in Hersh's article were corroborated by Carlotta Gall of The New York Times, who reported that she had previously been told by a "high-level member" of the ISI that Pakistan had been hiding bin Laden and that an ISI brigadier had informed the CIA of his location; NBC News also corroborated the claim of a retired ISI officer who had tipped off the CIA. Pakistani news outlets alleged the tipster was Brigadier Usman Khalid, who died in 2014. In an article in the Columbia Journalism Review, Trevor Timm, executive director of the Freedom of the Press Foundation, criticized some in the media for labeling Hersh a "conspiracy theorist", and for failing to pursue follow-up reporting that either corroborated or refuted his claims. He defended Hersh's use of anonymous sources, which he argued were ubiquitous and justified given the covert nature of the alleged operation, and praised a piece by Ali Watkins of The Huffington Post as one of the few that identified the tipster development as discrediting the CIA's claim that its torture of detainees had revealed the identity of bin Laden's courier, which had previously been challenged by the December 2014 report on torture by the Senate Intelligence Committee.

Nord Stream sabotage 
On February 8, 2023, in a Substack article titled "How America Took Out The Nord Stream Pipeline", Hersh alleged that the September 26, 2022, sabotage of the Nord Stream 1 and 2 pipelines, which carried natural gas from Russia to Germany through the Baltic Sea, was carried out by the U.S in a top-secret CIA operation ordered by President Joe Biden, with collaboration from Norway. The self-published post, which relied on one anonymous source "with direct knowledge of the operational planning", alleged that U.S. Navy divers operating from a Norwegian ship, using NATO's BALTOPS 22 exercise in June 2022 as cover, had planted C-4 mines which were later remotely detonated by a sonar buoy dropped from a Norwegian plane. The alleged motive was reducing Russian economic influence in Europe and cutting off a major source of state revenue; Nord Stream 2 was not yet operational, but would have doubled the gas supply of Nord Stream 1. Hersh cited statements against the pipeline made by Biden and his foreign policy team as support, including Biden's warning in February 2022, before the Russian invasion of Ukraine, that: "If Russia invades... there will no longer be a Nord Stream 2. We will bring an end to it."

The party responsible for the attack, which destroyed three of the four pipelines, was not widely known at the time of Hersh's report. Western countries had not formally accused Russia, though some officials suspected it was responsible; Russia had accused the United Kingdom's Royal Navy and later the U.S., and disputed the idea it would destroy the pipelines, which it majority-owned through Gazprom. In December 2022, The Washington Post reported that "23 diplomatic and intelligence officials in nine countries" had seen no evidence Russia was responsible, and The New York Times reported that Russia was quietly exploring costly repairs of the pipelines. Germany, Denmark, and Sweden opened investigations into the bombing; in February 2023, The Times reported that German investigators were open to theories that a Western state was responsible. After Hersh's report, the Russian foreign ministry called on the U.S. to comment; the U.S. National Security Council, State Department, and CIA, and Norway's foreign ministry, denied the charge. 

Kelly Vlahos, a senior advisor at the Quincy Institute for Responsible Statecraft, described the U.S. mainstream media response to Hersh's post as a "total blackout", arguing that his reporting "should have opened the floodgates of journalistic inquiry." The piece received widespread attention in independent media and European mainstream media, including in Germany, where the Bundestag held its first debate on the bombing on February 10 at the request of AfD. Members from the governing coalition (SPD, Greens, and FDP) and the CDU cautioned against "speculation" based on his reporting, while opposition members from Die Linke and AfD called on the executive branch to release the results of its investigation, which it had declared it would not publish "due to considerations regarding the welfare of the state". In Russia, Hersh's reporting was picked up by the state-controlled media agencies RT and TASS.

Some of Hersh's claims were criticized online by writers using open-source intelligence. In a Substack post, blogger Oliver Alexander disputed the claim that the U.S. divers operated from a Norwegian Alta-class minesweeper, as no ships of the class had taken part in BALTOPS 22; he noted the participation of the Hinnøy, a member of the similar Oksøy mine hunter class, but wrote that AIS data for the ship showed that it had passed several kilometers from the sites at its closest, without slowing down. He wrote that ADS-B records did not show the alleged "seemingly routine flight" by a Norwegian P-8 Poseidon in the hours before the explosions, and questioned the claim that NATO Secretary General Jens Stoltenberg had co-operated with U.S. intelligence since the Vietnam War, as Stoltenberg was just 16 years old in 1975. He also asked why only three of the four pipelines were sabotaged, which Hersh's post had not addressed. Hersh replied that U.S. intelligence had the ability to manipulate open-source data by spoofing or disabling location transponders. Norwegian fact-checking site Faktisk.no also pointed out numerous errors, such as Hersh listing non-existent Norwegian military bases and not mentioning that Norway's three P-8A Poseidons have yet to enter operative service. Similarly to Alexander, Faktisk.no reported that, assuming Hersh misidentified the ship, as no Alta-class minesweeper participated in the BALTOPS-22 exercise, the only viable candidate (KNM Hinnøy) appears to have not come closer than 8 kilometers from the explosion site, and to have been traveling with several other international ships, making its involvement highly unlikely.

In March 2023, the New York Times reported that new intelligence reporting suggested a "pro-Ukrainian group" was responsible for the attack, and the German newspaper Die Zeit reported that German investigators had found it was carried out by six people of unclear nationality diving from a yacht rented from a Ukrainian-owned Polish company. Hersh dismissed this account as implausible, and said it was an attempt to divert attention from his story.

Other statements

Seth Rich
In a January 2017 telephone conversation about the 2016 murder of Democratic National Committee staffer Seth Rich, Hersh told Fox News commentator Ed Butowsky that he had heard of an FBI report which found that Rich had tried to sell emails to WikiLeaks prior to his death. Although cautioned by Hersh that the information may not be true, Butowsky forwarded the taped call to the Rich family, who were encouraged to hire a private investigator quoted in a later-retracted Fox News article on the alleged FBI report. Hersh later said that he had heard "gossip", and that he was fishing for information.

Richard Nixon 
In his 2018 autobiography Reporter, Hersh wrote that he had heard in 1974 that Pat Nixon, wife of former president Richard Nixon, had been treated in an emergency room after her husband had hit her; former Nixon aide John Ehrlichman told Hersh about two previous incidents where Nixon struck his wife. Hersh wrote that he had decided not to report on this alleged abuse because he considered it part of Nixon's private life, which he later regretted.

Skripal poisoning 
In August 2018, Hersh said about the Skripal poisoning that "the story of novichok poisoning has not held up very well. He [Sergei Skripal] was most likely talking to British intelligence services about Russian organised crime," and that the contamination of other victims was suggestive that the poisoning was the responsibility of organized crime, rather than being state-sponsored.

Use of anonymous sources 
There has been sustained criticism of Hersh's use of anonymous sources. Critics, including Edward Jay Epstein and Amir Taheri, say he is over-reliant on them. Taheri, for example, when reviewing Hersh's Chain of Command (2004), complained:

In a 2003 interview with the Columbia Journalism Review, David Remnick, the editor of The New Yorker, stated that he was aware of the identity of all of the unnamed sources used in Hersh's New Yorker articles, saying "I know every single source that is in his pieces...Every 'retired intelligence officer,' every general with reason to know, and all those phrases that one has to use, alas, by necessity, I say, 'Who is it? What's his interest?' We talk it through."

In response to an article in The New Yorker in which Hersh alleged that the U.S. government was planning a strike on Iran, U.S. Defense Department spokesman Bryan G. Whitman said, "This reporter has a solid and well-earned reputation for making dramatic assertions based on thinly sourced, unverifiable anonymous sources."

In his Bin Laden story, "Hersh relied at least 55 times on an anonymous retired senior intelligence official." In 2015, Vox's Max Fisher wrote that "Hersh has appeared increasingly to have gone off the rails. His stories, often alleging vast and shadowy conspiracies, have made startling — and often internally inconsistent — accusations, based on little or no proof beyond a handful of anonymous 'officials'." Slate magazine's James Kirchick wrote, "Readers are expected to believe that the story of the Bin Laden assassination is a giant ‘fairy tale’ on the word of a single, unnamed source... Hersh's problem is that he evinces no skepticism whatsoever toward what his crank sources tell him, which is ironic considering how cynical he is regarding the pronouncements of the U.S. national security bureaucracy." Politico wrote in 2015 that Hersh's reporting had increasingly been called into question due to "his almost exclusive reliance on anonymous sources".

Speeches 
In an interview with New York magazine, Hersh made a distinction between the standards of strict factual accuracy for his print reporting and the leeway he allows himself in speeches, in which he may talk informally about stories still being worked on or blur information to protect his sources. "Sometimes I change events, dates, and places in a certain way to protect people. ... I can't fudge what I write. But I can certainly fudge what I say."

Some of Hersh's speeches concerning the Iraq War have described violent incidents involving U.S. troops in Iraq. In July 2004, during the height of the Abu Ghraib scandal, he alleged that American troops sexually assaulted young boys:

In a subsequent interview with New York magazine, Hersh regretted that "I actually didn't quite say what I wanted to say correctly. ... It wasn't that inaccurate, but it was misstated. The next thing I know, it was all over the blogs. And I just realized then, the power of—and so you have to try and be more careful." In Chain of Command, he wrote that one of the witness statements he had read described the rape of a boy by a foreign contract interpreter at Abu Ghraib, during which a woman took pictures.

Personal life 

Hersh married Elizabeth Sarah Klein, a psychiatrist, in 1964. They have three children.

Awards and honors 
Hersh's journalism and publishing awards include the Pulitzer Prize in 1970, five George Polk Awards (making him that award's most honored laureate as of 2004), two National Magazine Awards, and more than a dozen other prizes for investigative reporting:

 1969: George Polk Special Award, for reporting on the My Lai massacre (Dispatch News Service)
 1970: Pulitzer Prize for International Reporting, Worth Bingham Prize for Investigative Journalism, and Sigma Delta Chi Distinguished Service Award, for reporting on the My Lai massacre
 1973: George Polk Award for Investigative Reporting and Scripps-Howard Public Service Award, for reporting on Operation Menu (The New York Times) 
 1974: George Polk Award for National Reporting, for reporting on Operation CHAOS (The New York Times)
 1975: Hillman Prize for Newspaper Reporting, for reporting on Operation CHAOS
 1981: George Polk Award for National Reporting (with Jeff Gerth and Philip Taubman) and Sigma Delta Chi Award, for reporting on arms sales to Libya by former CIA agents (The New York Times)
 1983: National Book Critics Circle Award for Nonfiction, Los Angeles Times Book Prize for Biography, and Investigative Reporters & Editors Award, for The Price of Power: Kissinger in the Nixon White House
 1984: Hillman Prize for Book Reporting, for The Price of Power: Kissinger in the Nixon White House
 1992: Investigative Reporters & Editors Award, for The Samson Option: Israel's Nuclear Arsenal and American Foreign Policy
 2004: National Magazine Award for Public Interest, for articles on the Bush administration in the lead-up to the Iraq War (The New Yorker); George Polk Award for Magazine Reporting, Overseas Press Club Joe & Laurie Dine Award, and National Press Foundation Kiplinger Distinguished Contributions to Journalism Award, for reporting on the prisoner abuse at Abu Ghraib (The New Yorker); George Orwell Award for both stories
 2005: National Magazine Award for Public Interest, for reporting on the prisoner abuse at Abu Ghraib; Ridenhour Courage Prize 
 2009: International Center for Journalists Founders Award for Excellence in Journalism
 2017: Sam Adams Award

Publications

Books

Articles 
 Articles on the My Lai massacre (St. Louis Post-Dispatch; November 13, 20, and 25, 1969)
 Collected articles for The New Yorker (1971–2015)
 Collected articles for the London Review of Books (2013–2019)

References

Works cited

External links 
 
 
 
 
 

1937 births
Living people
20th-century American journalists
21st-century American journalists
20th-century American male writers
21st-century American male writers
21st-century American memoirists
American investigative journalists
American male journalists
American newspaper reporters and correspondents
American people of Lithuanian-Jewish descent
American people of Polish-Jewish descent
American people of the Vietnam War
American political writers
Espionage writers
George Polk Award recipients
Jewish American journalists
Jewish American writers
Journalists from Illinois
Mỹ Lai massacre
The New York Times writers
The New Yorker people
Pulitzer Prize for International Reporting winners
University of Chicago alumni
University of Chicago Law School alumni 
University of Illinois Chicago alumni
Watergate scandal investigators
Writers from Chicago